Inevitable Tour is the first concert tour by Mexican singer Samo. The tour was launched in support of Samo's first studio album Inevitable (2013). The tour began on September 10, 2013, in the People's Theater of Mineral de la Reforma, Hidalgo, Mexico.

Setlist

Tour dates

Music festivals and other miscellaneous performances
This concert is a part of Festival de Las Estrellas de Amor.
This concert is a part of Noche de Estrellas Fidelity.
This concert is a part of Fashion Tolum 2013. 
This concert is a part of Evento 40.

References

2013 concert tours